Kanyadanam is an Indian Telugu language soap opera aired on Gemini TV premiered on 20 September 2021and ended on 21 January 2023. The show stars Jessica, Samyuktha, Lahari Raghavendar, Sindhu, Vaishnavi, Suresh, Bhargav in leading roles. The serial was the reboot version of the Tamil television series Metti Oli that aired on SunTV.

Plot

Cast
Aditya as Moorthy (Adilakshmi, Bhagyalakshmi, Dhana Lakshmi, Sri Lakshmi and Vidyalakshmi's father)
Samyuktha as Adi Lakshmi, Moorthy's elder daughter and Venkat's wife
Spoorthi Gowda (1-154) /Swathi (155-360) / Jessica (360 - 418) as Bhagyalakshmi, Vishnu's wife
Lahari Raghavendar as Dhana Lakshmi, Ravi's wife
Sahithi/Sindhu as Sri Lakshmi, Vivek's wife
Vaishnavi as Vidya Lakshmi, Youngest daughter of Moorthy
Suresh as Venkat, Adi Lakshmi's husband
Bhargav as Vishnu, Bhagyalakshmi's husband
Sree Harsha as Vivek, Sri Lakshmi's husband
Abhi Yannam/Nagireddy as Ravi, Dhana Lakshmi's husband
Venkat Kiran as Hari, Vishnu's younger brother
Yamini/Sai Krupa/Pratyusha as Suma, Vishnu's sister
Bangalore Padma as Vishnu's mother
Krishna Priya as Kanthamma (Vishnu, Hari and Suma's grandmother)
Prem Sagar as Gangadhar
Leena Kushi
Rishika /Madhavi as prathima
Shilpa as Arundhati 
Naveen as Kalyan

Adaptations

References

Indian television soap operas
Telugu-language television shows
2021 Indian television series debuts
Gemini TV original programming
Telugu-language television series based on Tamil-language television series